Ultra the Multi-Alien is a science fiction superhero featured in comics published by DC Comics. He first appeared in Mystery in Space #103 (1965), pushing out Adam Strange and Space Ranger from that title. He was created by writer Dave Wood and artist Lee Elias.

Fictional character biography

Pre-Crisis
Ultra was originally Earth spaceman Ace Arn, living in an unspecified future era when spaceflight is commonplace. After crash landing on a planet in a far off solar system, he is attacked by four aliens, each a member of a different species from their respective planets Ulla, Laroo, Trago, and Raagan. The four aliens simultaneously shoot him with rayguns designed to transform him into an obedient member of their respective species. Because all four rays hit him at the same time, he is instead transformed into a combination of the four aliens, but free of their control. The upper right section of his body grew green fur and gained super strength; the upper left section turned blue and gained magnetic powers; his right leg grew feathers and small wings, giving him the ability to fly; and his left leg is transformed into a bolt of lightning.

He combined the first letter of the worlds the four aliens were from, along with the first letter of his name to come up with: U-L-T-R-A, his new name. He soon finds a device to convert back to human form, giving him a secret identity. His series lasted until issue #110 (1966), when Mystery in Space was cancelled. He would not reappear for several years.

Post-Crisis
Ultra was one of Wizard Magazine's "Mort of the Month", a featurette showcasing comic characters considered low-quality. Grant Morrison used him both in his run in Animal Man (in issue #25 Ultra and other pre-Crisis characters appear in comic book limbo) and in the Aztek monthly series (though not shown, Ultra makes two appearances).

The character appeared in Starman #55 (1999), in which Ultra, along with Space Ranger, is riding in Space Cabby's cab and looking for Starman IV's cosmic staff for the Space Museum. Each regales the other with different interpretations of Jack and Mikaal rescuing Starfire from a space pirate.

Geoff Johns was the next writer to use these concepts. A storyline in Stars and S.T.R.I.P.E. involved Young Justice teaming with Star-Spangled Kid and S.T.R.I.P.E. to stop a group of Larroo (one of the four aliens from Ultra's origin) from using their ray to turn everyone in Blue Valley into Larroo. It was established that the Larroo had invented the ray, but were preparing to sell it to the other three alien races.

Ultra appeared as a background character in the Infinite Crisis event. Having apparently somehow traveled back in time to the present era, Ultra is one of the many space-faring heroes who aid Donna Troy in the fallout of the Rann-Thanagar War. He also appeared in Superman/Batman #31 (2007), overwhelmed by an alien influence that is affecting many of the part-alien heroes on earth. After a highly destructive rampage through the American town of Dalesville, he leaves (causing more destruction upon his exit) with Supergirl, also affected. In "Superman/Batman" #33, he and other influenced aliens try to destroy the titular heroes. Fortunately his mind is soon cleared of all influence and the villain behind it all, Despero, is defeated.

The planet Larroo appeared in Action Comics #867. Brainiac attacked the planet while searching the universe for Superman. Superman arrived but could do nothing. A city containing all four races which created Ultra was contained within a forcefield, shrunk and captured. Their star was detonated and Superman was left floating among the remains of the planet. One of his most recent appearance is in the same Action Comics storyline, where he was held with other humanoid characters on Brainiac's ship, such as the Creature Commandos. An attack by super-villains frees Ultra and he is taken into the custody of the United States government. Vixen later mentions him as a potential Justice League member (albeit half-jokingly). He later appeared in the 2011 Strange Adventures one-shot.

The New 52
In The New 52, Ultra the Multi-Alien is re-established as the result of an experiment of Lord Byth's, in which he combined the DNA of alien prisoners in an attempt to create the Slayer of Worlds.

Powers and abilities
Ultra the Multi-Alien's body is composed of the anatomy of the four different aliens from Ulla, Laroo, Trago, and Raagan. Each of these parts grants him a different power:

 Ultra's superhuman strength is derived from the upper right (green) quarter of his body. Although his strength levels are likely not isolated to just that location.
 Ultra has the ability to attract and repel quantities of matter similar to a magnet. This ability originates from the upper left (blue) quarter of Ultra the Multi-Alien's body.
 Ultra is capable of directional flight and levitation without the aid of external assistance. This ability originates from the lower right (feathered) quarter of Ultra the Multi-Alien's body.
 Ultra's lower left quarter is composed of electrical energy and allows him to project blasts of high voltage electricity.

Ultra can generate electromagnetic charges by combining magnetokinesis and electrokinesis. He also developed cosmic awareness during his time in Limbo. Ultra is an expert pilot in his human identity and wears a hyper-converter belt which enables him to switch back and forth from his human form to his heroic identity.

In other media
 Ultra the Multi-Alien makes a non-speaking cameo appearance in the Batman: The Brave and the Bold episode "The Siege of Starro!".
 Ultra the Multi-Alien makes a cameo appearance in Superman: Unbound.
 Ultra the Multi-Alien was discussed in a segment of Conan, with the eponymous Conan O'Brien calling him a mess.

Reception
In American Comic Book Chronicles, John Wells writes: "Debuting in MIS #103, Ultra the Multi-Alien was undeniably different but not in ways that many readers thought were any good... The concept itself wasn't necessarily bad... but Ultra just looked silly. He was part bald blue man and part hairy green monster set atop a bird's leg and a lightning bolt".

References

External links
 Ultra the Multi-Alien at DC Comics Wiki
 Ultra the Multi-Alien at Comic Vine
 Ultra the Multi-Alien at Don Markstein's Toonopedia. Archived from the original on March 6, 2015.
 DC Universe entry on Ultra
 Amazing World of DC entry on Ultra
 DCU Guide: Ultra the Multi-Alien

Fictional astronauts
DC Comics characters with superhuman strength
DC Comics superheroes
Comics characters introduced in 1965
Fictional characters with electric or magnetic abilities
Characters created by Lee Elias